Bavarian (also Romanized as Bāvarīān, Bāvareyān, Bāvarīyān, and Bāvaryān) is a village in Khvajehei Rural District, Meymand District, Firuzabad County, Fars Province, Iran. At the 2006 census, its population was 459, in 124 families.

References 

Populated places in Firuzabad County